Up the Junction is a 1963 collection of short stories by Nell Dunn that depicts contemporary life in the industrial slums of Battersea and Clapham Junction.

The book uses colloquial speech, and its portrayal of petty thieving, sexual encounters, births, deaths and back-street abortion provided a view of life that was previously unrecognised by many people. The book won the 1963 John Llewellyn Rhys Memorial Prize.

Adaptations
In 1965 it was adapted for television by the BBC as part of The Wednesday Play anthology series directed by Ken Loach.

A cinema film version followed in 1968 with a soundtrack by Manfred Mann.

The television version of the play was the inspiration for the 1979 Squeeze hit "Up the Junction".

References

External links

1963 short story collections
Books adapted into films
John Llewellyn Rhys Prize-winning works
Novels set in London
Battersea
MacGibbon & Kee books